Lee Jong-Hwan (born 1930) was a South Korean footballer and football administrator.
He was the first manager of Jeju United FC and president of the Korea Football Association.

References

External links 
 Profile at Naver

1930 births
Living people
South Korean football managers
Busan IPark managers
Jeju United FC managers